Édouard Creuzé de Lesser (12 February 1883 – 7 March 1967) was a French sport shooter who competed in the 1912 Summer Olympics.

He was born in Paris and died in Mayenne, Mayenne. In 1912 he was a member of the French team which finished sixth in the team clay pigeons event. In the individual trap competition he finished 41st.

References

1883 births
1967 deaths
French male sport shooters
Trap and double trap shooters
Olympic shooters of France
Shooters at the 1912 Summer Olympics